Tårnby station is an underground railway station on the Øresund Line. It is located in Tårnby, on the island of Amager. Tårnby is a municipality of its own, but its build-up parts are included in Copenhagen's urban area. Travels from this station are included in the common ticket system in and around Copenhagen. Departures take place every approximately 10 minutes in both directions. The station building is owned by Sund & Bælt.

Designed by KHR Arkitekter, the station opened in 2000 when the line was inaugurated.

References

Railway stations in Copenhagen
Railway stations opened in 2000
Øresund Line
Tårnby Municipality
Railway stations located underground in Denmark
Railway stations in Denmark opened in the 21st century